Moraviantown may refer to:

Battle of Moraviantown, better known as Battle of the Thames
Moravian 47, Ontario, home of The Moraviantown Delaware Nation
Munsee language, spoken only on the Moraviantown Reserve in Ontario, Canada by five living people
Christian Munsee, also known as the Moravian Munsee

See also
Moravian (disambiguation)